Hadley Point is the northeast point of Murray Foreland, Martin Peninsula, on the Bakutis Coast of Marie Byrd Land, Antarctica. It was mapped by the United States Geological Survey from surveys and U.S. Navy aerial photographs, 1959–67, and was named by the Advisory Committee on Antarctic Names after Richard C. Hadley, U.S. Navy, who wintered at McMurdo Station in 1959 and in other years through 1977, and was in charge of supply functions at McMurdo during the last deployment.

References

Headlands of Marie Byrd Land
Bakutis Coast